Floresta (Sicilian: Fluresta) is a comune (municipality) in the Metropolitan City of Messina in the Italian region Sicily, located about  east of Palermo and about  southwest of Messina.

Floresta borders the following municipalities: Raccuja, Randazzo, Montalbano Elicona, Santa Domenica Vittoria, Tortorici, Ucria.

References

External links
 Official website

Cities and towns in Sicily